What About Joan? is an American sitcom that aired on ABC for two seasons in 2001. It starred Joan Cusack as Joan Gallagher, a Chicago schoolteacher and the comedy of her day-to-day life. It co-starred Kyle Chandler. It was produced by James L. Brooks, Richard Sakai, David Richardson, and Ed Weinberger.

Synopsis
Joan Cusack played a high school teacher on the verge of a deepening relationship with Chandler. It was filmed before a live studio audience in Chicago and edited in Los Angeles. Joan's apartment was supposed to be located in the Ravenswood neighborhood of Chicago.

Cast
 Joan Cusack as Joan Gallagher
 Kyle Chandler as Jake Evans
 Donna Murphy as Dr. Ruby Stern
 Kellie Shanygne Williams as Alice Adams
 Wallace Langham as Mark Ludlow
 Phil Tyler as James
 Jessica Hecht as Betsy Morgan (season 1)

Episodes

Season 1: 2001

Season 2: 2001

References

External links
 
 

2000s American high school television series
2000s American sitcoms
2000s American workplace comedy television series
2001 American television series debuts
2001 American television series endings
American Broadcasting Company original programming
English-language television shows
Television series about educators
Television series by Gracie Films
Television series by Sony Pictures Television
Television shows set in Chicago